, known as Saga Station until 1994, is a railway station on the West Japan Railway Company (JR West) Sanin Main Line (Sagano Line) in Ukyo-ku, Kyoto, Japan. The Sagano Scenic Railway also starts here.

Saga-Arashiyama Station is also one of the historic railway station located at the southern end of Kyoto city of Japan. The station was built in more than a century which now became the eighth station of the San’in Main Line that connects Kyoto and Sonobe and serves some minor sightseeing transport interchange for light rail services, bus services, tram services.

Saga-Arashiyama Station is also known as the Arashiyama Station. Saga-Arashiyama Station was first owned by the Keifuku Electric Railroad, a railway company operated in Kyoto. It was then combined with the West Japan Railway Company (JR West) on March 25, 1910.  Recorded that the boarding times is around 6000 people on average at that moment.

Saga-Arashiyama Station is bounded by Kyoto Prefectural Kitasaga High school in the north, Saga University of Arts Hombu Campus in the south, Kyoto Prefectural Sagano High School in the east, and bunches of temple and shrine in the west. The entire Saga-Arashiyama Station is associated with two connections train services at the neighbouring, which is Sagano Scenic Railway in the west and Randen-Saga Station in the south.

History 
Despite the fact that Kyoto Railway is then nationalised, Kyoto railway was renamed as “Kyoto line” and San’in Main line ”one after another. The extension of the line toward  finally opened in 1899. The station was renamed to its present name on September 4, 1994. Kyoto line is then privatised according to the division of the Japan National Railways Company, Kyoto line is then becoming one of the stations that belong to the West Japan Railway Company (JR West). Until 1994, Saga Station changed its current name to Saga-Arashiyama station, so as the name Saga-Arashiyama station is related to the relatively famous Arashiyama, which is an amiable district in the western area of Kyoto Prefecture, as well as to enhance the value of tourism.

Saga-Arashiyama station is the only one JR station, that is the closest to the Western suburbs of Kyoto, the Togetsu-kyō Bridge that across the Katsura River, as a result, it is quite smooth to be confused as in Arashiyama area, yet in fact, according to the differentiation of local area, Saga-Arashiyama Station is located at the north shore of Katsuragawa Station, which is generally named as Sagano, while the south shore is the actual Arashiyama, including world heritage sites like Tenryu-Ji Temple, are located within a walking distance of the Saga-Arashiyama Station as the significant tourists' hub.

The building station of Saga-Arashiyama station that are still currently in use was the 2nd generation building station that was completed and applied into fully functioning since the end of 2008. The 1st generation building station has been continuously used since the inauguration of the Kyoto Railway in 1897. In light of that, the 1st generation building station was the earliest services centre station under the West Japan Railway Company (JR West) before its demolition.

The terminal Arashiyama Main station of Arashiyama Honsen Line is located a few blocks away from the southern side of the station (approximately 300 meters away), which is still a convenient walking distance for transportation transfer. On the other hand, the terminal Hankyu Arashiyama station of Hankyu Arashiyama Line is located on the southern side of Katsura, required a 20 minutes walk to cross the Togetsu-kyō Bridge.

Station numbering was introduced in March 2018 with Saga-Arashiyama being assigned station number JR-E08.

Station Layout

Saga-Arashiyama Station is designed as 2 island platforms with 4 train routes in total, combine with the ground station and cross - station as equipment. For platform 1 and 2, with the upward direction, heading to Kyoto direction; for platform 3 and 4, which is downward direction, heading to Sonobe direction. There is no any other transfer trains platform found in Saga-Arashiyama Station, the only method would be considering to take alternative routes located at Hankyu Arashiyama Station as well as Keifuku Arashiyama Station, which all of these stations are adequately conducive. The line that is decided to use is absolutely based on the starting location.

Platforms 
The Saga-Arashiyama Station was re-designed by the West Japan Railway Company in the late 1900s; it was first designed to be a transfer station along the Sagano Line, yet Kyoto tourism boom since 1994, which is the year that Arashiyama Station changes the name into Saga-Arashiyama Station.

Until now this platform has received more than 7.4 million foreign guests travelled to Saga- Arashiyama Station for the surrounding visiting. Including domestic tourists, this platform hosted more than 50 million visitors, compared to Kyoto, with only 1.7 million population in total.

Adjacent stations
One route to arrive Saga-Arashiyama Station from central Kyoto is to take the Hankyu Line then arrive at the Omiya Station, after that transfer to the Keifuku Randen tramline.

The tram is designed in an old fashion way trolley car which will only take 20 minutes to reach the destination.

Another way to arrive Saga-Arashiyama station is by taking the Sagano Line operated under the San’in Main Line. Every 15 minutes, there will be either local or rapid train to arrive at Sonobe Station from central Kyoto. After arriving at Sagano Station, just simply walk from Sagano Station to Saga-Arashiyama station with just the about 10 minutes.

Connecting lines from Saga-Arashiyama 
Sagano Scenic Railway (Torokko Saga Station located in front of Saga-Arashiyama Station)
Keifuku Electric Railroad (Randen Saga Station located about 300 m south of Saga-Arashiyama Station)
Several connecting services can get to Saga-Arashiyama Station, access by Japan Railways undoubtedly is the fastest way to arrive, instead, approach by Keifuku railways (Randen-Saga Station), by Hankyu Railways, by bus lines as well as by personal vehicles are also plans to arrive Saga-Arashiyama Station.

Bus services 
Bus transportation services associated Saga-Arashiyama Station with disparate parts of Kyoto. Catching the Kyoto city bus number 28 and exit via the Arashiyama Tenryuji-mae. The total trip consumes approximately 30 minutes. This bus route runs through Kyoto Station to Tenryu-ji Temple and Arashiyama with the bus fee which is 230 yen for adult and 120 yen for children under 12 years old.

Sightseeing Tram services 
The Sagano Romantic Train is an amusing sightseeing train run by the Sagano Scenic Railway in the Saga-Arashiyama area of the western Kyoto. Sagano Romantic Train is also known as the “Sagano Torokko Ressha” in Japanese. Sagano Romantic Train utilised old intended trains that built in the 19th century. This train travel along the Hozugawa River gorge, cover with an absurd countryside view at the surrounding. Sagano Romantic Train is relatively attractive during Autumn, although tourists can appreciate the different landscapes during each season.

The one-way ticket for adult and kid is 620 yen and 310 yen comparatively. There will be 8 train rides in total from 9 am to 4 pm every day at Saga-Torokko Station. Moreover, this Sagano Scenic Railway requires a reservation, except the car no.5 which is granted to be brought on that day as well as several standing tickets available to purchase on the day of travel.

Tram services 
The Keifuku Randen Tram line is negotiated by an individual company Keifuku Electric Railroad. The Arashiyama line of the tram line passes through east to west from Shijo-Omiya Station to Keifuku Arashiyama Station. The distance between Keifuku Arashiyama Station (also known as the Arashiyama Station) and Saga Arashiyama Station is approximately 20 minutes walking distance. The tram fee for adult and kid is 210 yen and 110 yen respectively.

Furthermore, as the Keifuku Randen Tram line is managed by a private company(Keifuku Electric Railroad), as a result, all other Japan rail pass is not covered. Instead, the private company has designed a 1-Day tram pass for unlimited rides on the Keifuku Randen Tram line with discount rate included.

References

Railway stations in Japan opened in 1897
Railway stations in Kyoto Prefecture
Sanin Main Line